The Illegal may refer to:

Alambrista!, a 1977 film directed by Robert M. Young
The Illegal (novel), a 2015 novel by Lawrence Hill
The Illegal (film), a 2019 Indian American English-language drama film written and directed by Danish Renzu

See also
Illegal (disambiguation)